Brenton Jones (born 12 December 1991) is an Australian racing cyclist, who currently rides for Australian amateur team Inform TMX MAKE.

Major results

2012
 10th Time trial, Oceania Under-23 Road Championships
2014
 Tour de Singkarak
1st Stages 7 & 9
 1st Stage 3 New Zealand Cycle Classic
 3rd  Road race, Oceania Road Championships
2015
 1st Stage 9 Tour of Hainan
 1st Stage 1 (ITT) Tour of Japan
2016
 Tour de Korea
1st  Points classification
1st Stages 4 & 8
2017
 1st London Nocturne
 Tour Series
1st Round 2 - Stoke-on-Trent
1st Round 7 - Motherwell
 1st Stage 5 Tour de Korea
 1st Stage 5 Tour de Taiwan
 3rd Rutland–Melton CiCLE Classic
2018
 1st Stage 2 Tour of Qinghai Lake
 4th Rund um Köln
 4th Cholet-Pays de la Loire
 5th Overall La Tropicale Amissa Bongo
1st  Points classification
1st Stages 2 & 5
2019
 1st  Criterium, National Road Championships
 1st Stage 2 Tour of Qinghai Lake
 5th Overall Bay Classic Series
 7th Overall Tour of Taihu Lake
1st Stage 5
2020
 2nd Dorpenomloop Rucphen
2022
 2nd Melbourne to Warrnambool Classic
 3rd Overall Bay Classic Series

References

External links

1991 births
Living people
Australian male cyclists
Cyclists from Victoria (Australia)